Nuculana is a genus of bivalves in the family Nuculanidae. It includes the following species:

Species

 Nuculana acapulcensis (Pilsbry & Lowe, 1932)
 Nuculana acinacea Habe, 1958
 Nuculana acuta (Conrad, 1832)
 Nuculana aikawai Habe, 1958
 Nuculana amiata
 Nuculana anakena Raines & Huber, 2012
 Nuculana approximans Prashad, 1932
 Nuculana arai Habe, 1958
 Nuculana aspecta
 Nuculana bathybia Prashad, 1932
 Nuculana belcheri (Hinds, 1843)
 Nuculana bellula (A. Adams, 1856)
 Nuculana bicuspidata (Gould, 1845)
 Nuculana bipennis (Dall, 1927)
 Nuculana brookei (Hanley, 1860)
 Nuculana bushiana (A. E. Verrill, 1884)
 Nuculana caloundra Iredale, 1929
 Nuculana caudata (Donovan, 1801)
 Nuculana cellulita (Dall, 1896)
 Nuculana cestrota
 Nuculana comita (Cotton & Godfrey, 1938)
 Nuculana concentrica (Say, 1824)
 Nuculana conceptionis (Dall, 1896)
 Nuculana confusa (Hanley, 1860)
 Nuculana corbuloides (E. A. Smith, 1885)
 Nuculana cordyla (Dall, 1908)
 Nuculana cornidei Altimira, 1974
 Nuculana costellata (G. B. Sowerby I, 1833)
 Nuculana crassa (Hinds, 1843)
 Nuculana crenulata
 Nuculana cuneata (G. B. Sowerby I, 1833)
 Nuculana cygnea (Thiele & Jaeckel, 1931)
 Nuculana dalli
 Nuculana darwini (E. A. Smith, 1884)
 Nuculana dasea (Hedley, 1915)
 Nuculana decora (A. Adams, 1856)
 Nuculana dohrni (Hanley, 1861)
 Nuculana egregia (Guppy, 1882)
 Nuculana elaborata Prashad, 1932
 Nuculana electilis (Hedley, 1915)
 Nuculana ensiformis Scarlato, 1981
 Nuculana extenuata
 Nuculana fastidiosa (A. Adams, 1856)
 Nuculana forticostata Xu, 1991
 Nuculana fortis (Hedley, 1907)
 Nuculana fulgida (A. Adams, 1856)
 Nuculana fumosa E. A. Smith, 1895
 Nuculana gemmulata G. B. Sowerby III, 1904
 Nuculana gomphoidea
 Nuculana gordonis (Yokoyama, 1920)
 Nuculana grasslei
 Nuculana gruveli (Nicklès, 1952)
 Nuculana hamata (Carpenter, 1864)
 Nuculana hebes (E. A. Smith, 1885)
 Nuculana husamaru Nomura, 1940
 Nuculana ikebei Suzuki & Kanehara, 1936
 Nuculana investigator (Dell, 1952)
 Nuculana irradiata (G. B. Sowerby II, 1870)
 Nuculana isikela (Kilburn, 1994)
 Nuculana jamaicensis (d'Orbigny, 1853)
 Nuculana jovis (Thiele & Jaeckel, 1931)
 Nuculana karlmartini Weisbord, 1964
 Nuculana kiiensis Tsuchida & Okutani, 1985
 Nuculana lamellata G. B. Sowerby III, 1904
 Nuculana lanceta (Boshoff, 1968)
 Nuculana larranagai Klappenbach & Scarabino, 1969
 Nuculana leonina (Dall, 1896)
 Nuculana liogona
 Nuculana loshka (Dall, 1908)
 Nuculana mabillei (Dautzenberg & H. Fischer, 1897)
 Nuculana manawatawhia Powell, 1937
 Nuculana marella Hertlein, Hanna & Strong, 1940
 Nuculana mauritiana (G. B. Sowerby I, 1833)
 Nuculana messanensis
 Nuculana micans (Hanley, 1860)
 Nuculana minuta (O. F. Müller, 1776)
 Nuculana modica Prashad, 1932
 Nuculana montagui (Gray, 1825)
 Nuculana navisa (Dall, 1916)
 Nuculana neaeriformis (E. A. Smith, 1885)
 Nuculana neimanae Scarlato, 1981
 Nuculana novaeguineensis (E. A. Smith, 1885)
 Nuculana oculata Iredale, 1925
 Nuculana orixa
 Nuculana ornata
 Nuculana oxia
 Nuculana parsimonia Barnard, 1963
 Nuculana pella (Linnaeus, 1767)
 Nuculana penderi
 Nuculana pernula (O. F. Müller, 1779)
 Nuculana platessa
 Nuculana prostrata (Thiele & Jaeckel, 1931)
 Nuculana puellata (Hinds, 1843)
 Nuculana radiata
 Nuculana ramsayi (E. A. Smith, 1885)
 Nuculana reticulata (Hinds, 1843)
 Nuculana rhytida (Dall, 1908)
 Nuculana robai (Kuroda, 1929)
 Nuculana robsoni Prashad, 1932
 Nuculana sachalinica Scarlato, 1981
 Nuculana scalata Prashad, 1932
 Nuculana sculpta (Issel, 1869)
 Nuculana sematensis Suzuki & Ishizuka, 1943
 Nuculana semen (E. A. Smith, 1885)
 Nuculana sibogai Prashad, 1932
 Nuculana silicula (Thiele & Jaeckel, 1931)
 Nuculana sinensis Xu, 1984
 Nuculana solida (Dall, 1881)
 Nuculana soyoae Habe, 1958
 Nuculana spargana
 Nuculana subaequilatera
 Nuculana sufficientia Poppe & Tagaro, 2016
 Nuculana taiwanica Okutani & Lan, 1998
 Nuculana takaoensis Otsuka, 1936
 Nuculana tamara
 Nuculana tanseimaruae Tsuchida & Okutani, 1985
 Nuculana tashiensis Lan & Lee, 2001
 Nuculana tenuisulcata (Couthouy, 1838)
 Nuculana tuberculata (E. A. Smith, 1872)
 Nuculana ultima (E. A. Smith, 1885)
 Nuculana ventricosa (Hinds, 1843)
 Nuculana verconis (Tate, 1891)
 Nuculana verrilliana (Dall, 1886)
 Nuculana vestita (Locard, 1898)
 Nuculana vitrea (d'Orbigny, 1853)
 Nuculana vulgaris (Brown & Pilsbry, 1913)
 Nuculana watsoni (E. A. Smith, 1885)
 Nuculana whitensis Farinati, 1978
 Nuculana wolffi (Nicklès, 1955)
 Nuculana yokoyamai Kuroda, 1934

References

Nuculanidae
Bivalve genera